The 2015 WTA Awards are a series of awards given by the Women's Tennis Association to players who have achieved something remarkable during the 2015 WTA Tour.

The awards
These awards are decided by either the media, the players, the association, or the fans. Nominees were announced by the WTA's Twitter account.

Note: award winners in bold

Player of the Year
 Garbiñe Muguruza
 Flavia Pennetta
 Agnieszka Radwańska
 Serena Williams

Doubles Team of the Year
 Casey Dellacqua &  Yaroslava Shvedova
 Martina Hingis &  Sania Mirza
 Ekaterina Makarova &  Elena Vesnina
 Bethanie Mattek-Sands &  Lucie Šafářová

Most Improved Player of the Year
 Timea Bacsinszky Belinda Bencic
 Johanna Konta
 Karolína Plíšková
 Anna Karolina Schmiedlova

Newcomer of the Year
 Margarita Gasparyan
 Daria Gavrilova Nao Hibino
 Darya Kasatkina

Comeback Player of the Year
 Kateryna Bondarenko
 Bethanie Mattek-Sands
 Anastasija Sevastova
 Venus WilliamsKaren Krantzcke Sportsmanship Award
 Petra KvitováPeachy Kellmeyer Player Service Award
 Lucie ŠafářováDiamond Aces
 Caroline WozniackiFan Favourite Player
 Serena Williams
 Sania Mirza
 Simona Halep
 Garbiñe Muguruza
 Maria Sharapova
 Agnieszka Radwańska Petra Kvitová
 Venus Williams
 Lucie Šafářová
 Angelique Kerber
 Karolína Plíšková
 Belinda Bencic
 Ana Ivanovic
 Caroline Wozniacki
 Madison Keys
 Elina Svitolina
 Sara Errani
 Jelena Janković
 Victoria Azarenka
 Ekaterina Makarova
 Andrea Petkovic
 Sabine Lisicki
 Dominika Cibulková
 Alizé Cornet
 Eugenie Bouchard

Womance of the Year
 Belinda Bencic &  Kristina Mladenovic
 Garbiñe Muguruza &  Carla Suárez Navarro
 Martina Hingis &  Sania Mirza
 Flavia Pennetta &  Roberta Vinci 
 Serena Williams &  Caroline Wozniacki Bethanie Mattek-Sands &  Lucie Šafářová

Post of the Year
 Serena Williams Simona Halep
 Agnieszka Radwańska
 Garbiñe Muguruza
 Caroline Wozniacki

Selfie of the Year
 Andrea Petkovic
 Serena Williams
 Ana Ivanovic Victoria Azarenka
 Petra Kvitová

#TBT (Throwback Thursday) of the Year
 Maria Sharapova
 Venus Williams Victoria Azarenka
 Eugenie Bouchard
 Heather Watson

LOL of the Year
 Maria Sharapova Caroline Wozniacki
 Ana Ivanovic
 Venus Williams
 Petra Kvitová

AWW of the Year
 Ana Ivanovic
 Victoria Azarenka
 Maria Sharapova
 Serena Williams Agnieszka Radwańska

Fan Favourite WTA Video of the Year
 WTA Live Fan Access | Serena Williams vs Caroline Wozniacki
 WTA Emojis()
 WTA RacquetSabers
 WTA Live Fan Access | Genie Bouchard Big Bang Theory Quiz
 Canadian or Not Canadian

Fan Favorite WTA Shot of the Year
 Agnieszka Radwańska, 2015 Miami Open third round (18%)
 Angelique Kerber, 2015 Stuttgart Open first round (6%)
 Simona Halep, 2015 Rogers Cup semifinal (34%) Agnieszka Radwańska, 2015 WTA Finals final (42%)()

Fan Favorite WTA Match of the Year
 Maria Sharapova vs.  Ana Ivanovic, Brisbane final
 Petra Kvitová vs.  Karolína Plíšková, Sydney final
 Serena Williams vs.  Simona Halep, Miami semifinal
 Angelique Kerber vs.  Madison Keys, Charleston final
 Angelique Kerber vs.  Caroline Wozniacki, Stuttgart final
 Serena Williams vs.  Victoria Azarenka, Madrid third round
 Angelique Kerber vs.  Karolína Plíšková, Birmingham final
 Angelique Kerber vs.  Agnieszka Radwańska, Stanford quarterfinal
 Belinda Bencic vs.  Serena Williams, Toronto semifinal
 Agnieszka Radwańska vs.  Garbiñe Muguruza, WTA Finals semifinal (6–7, 6–3, 7–5)()

Fan Favorite Grand Slam Match of the Year
 Dominika Cibulková vs.  Victoria Azarenka, Australian Open fourth round
 Serena Williams vs.  Maria Sharapova, Australian Open final
 Francesca Schiavone vs.  Svetlana Kuznetsova, French Open second round
 Serena Williams vs.  Lucie Šafářová, French Open final
 Serena Williams vs.  Heather Watson, Wimbledon third round
 Garbiñe Muguruza vs.  Agnieszka Radwańska, Wimbledon semifinal
 Victoria Azarenka vs.  Angelique Kerber, US Open third round (7–5, 2–6, 6–4)()
 Serena Williams vs.  Venus Williams, US Open quarterfinal

Best Dressed on-court
 Sloane Stephens, Wimbledon
 Agnieszka Radwańska, Toronto Maria Sharapova, French Open
 Bethanie Mattek-Sands, US Open
 Ana Ivanovic, US Open
 Serena Williams, Australian Open
 Simona Halep, Toronto
 Venus Williams, Miami
 Caroline Wozniacki, Dubai
 Victoria Azarenka, US Open

Best Dressed off-court
 Maria Sharapova, WTA Finals Draw Ceremony
 Eugenie Bouchard, WTA Pre-Wimbledon Party
 Serena Williams, Wimbledon Champions Dinner
 Simona Halep, Iconic Player Party in Paris'''
 Garbiñe Muguruza, WTA Finals Draw Ceremony
 Ana Ivanovic, WTA Pre-Wimbledon Party
 Caroline Wozniacki, ESPYS

References

WTA Awards
2015 WTA Tour